Volume Gallery is a commercial art gallery focused on design and contemporary art. It is located in West Town, Chicago. Volume Gallery represents artists and designers working in diverse disciplines such as ceramics, fiber, glass, and object design. The gallery presents seven curated thematic and solo exhibitions a year with an emphasis on emerging and mid-career artists. 

Volume Gallery has participated in fairs such as FOG Design+Art Fair in San Francisco, Felix LA, EXPO Chicago, NADA in New York, Collective in New York, and Design Miami.

Volume Gallery has shown architect-designed objects from architects Norman Kelley, Krueck + Sexton, Pezo Von Ellrichshausen, Ania Jaworska and Stanley Tigerman. The gallery program emphasizes fiber and textile, ceramic, and glass works.

History 
It was founded by Claire Warner and Sam Vinz in 2010. They had met while working at Wright auction house.

In 2017 Warner and Vinz were named among the five most important new dealers on the forefront of design in The New York Times Style Magazine. They were featured in Newcity's list of influentials who lead Chicago’s design scene on Design 50: Who Shapes Chicago 2017.

In 2017, Volume Gallery moved from its West Loop location to West Town along with galleries, Document, PLHK, Western Exhibitions, and Rhona Hoffman Gallery.

Artists 

Volume Gallery represents emerging and mid-career contemporary artists and the design work of architects and contemporary designers.

 (after RO/LU)
 Michael C. Andrews
 Aranda\Lasch with Terrol Dew Johnson
 Tanya Aguiñiga
 Benas Burdulis
 Jojo Chuang
 Pezo Von Ellrichshausen
 Evan Gruzis
 Ross Hansen
 Matthias Merkel Hess
 Jennefer Hoffmann
 James Hyde
 Sung Jang
 Ania Jaworska
 Norman Kelley
 Thomas Leinberger
 Luftwerk
  Johnston Marklee & Associates
 Christy Matson
 Jonathan Muecke
 Charlie O’Geen
 Jonathan Olivares
 OOIEE
 Leon Ransmeier
 Anders Ruhwald
 Krueck + Sexton
Snarkitecture
 Stanley Tigerman
 Thaddeus Wolfe
 Young & Ayata

References

External links
 Volume Gallery website

Art museums and galleries in Chicago
Contemporary art galleries in the United States